Monte Kali and Kalimanjaro are local colloquial names for the spoil heap or spoil tip that towers over the town of Heringen, Hesse, Germany. It is one of a number of sites where the K+S chemical company dumps sodium chloride (common table salt), a byproduct of potash mining and processing, a major industry in the area.

The heap lies directly next to the border with the state of Thuringia, and hence next to the former inner German border with what was once East Germany.

According to the Werra Potash Mining Museum in Heringen, Monte Kali has been in operation since 1976; as of August 2016, it covered  and contained approximately 201 million tonnes of salt, with another 900 tonnes being added every hour and 7.2 million tonnes a year.

Ecological impact

The Werra river has become salty (≥500 mg/L chloride at Gerstungen, and 65 mg/L chloride at Bad Salzungen (measurement of June 2003). The legal limit is at 2,500 mg/L chloride, which is saltier than parts of the Baltic Sea. The groundwater has become salty as well. The invertebrate fauna was reduced from 60–100 species to 3. K+S are licensed to keep dumping salt at the facility until 2030.

References

External links

Hills of Hesse
Salt mines in Germany
Potash mines
Environmental impact of mining
Water pollution in Germany
Kali
Artificial hills